The wheatbelt railway lines of Western Australia were, in most cases, a network of railway lines in Western Australia that primarily served the Wheatbelt region.

Maps of the Western Australian Government Railways (WAGR) system in the 1930s show that in the main wheatbelt region, any railway line was within  of the harvest location, facilitating ease of access to rail transport. Most of the larger extent of the network has since been closed.

In the current railway management systems, many of the remaining operating lines are primarily for the haulage of grain.

1900s

In 1905 the report of the Royal Commission into Immigration in Western Australia stated:
All considerable areas of agricultural land must have a 15 mile rail service

In 1947, the Royal Commission into Railway management stated of the 1905 and after era of construction:

... to construct railways in agricultural areas as cheaply as possible, lines were built with 45 lb. rail sections which practically followed the surface of the ground with (a) earth ballasting (b) half-round timber sleepers (c) providing the bare minimum station facilities only

1930s

Transport of wheat on the WAGR system was identified by station/siding early in annual reports, as a commodity of importance to the railways.

Early transport of grain was organised through the railways and growers with the Cooperative Wheat Pool of Western Australia as a main player.

The feasibility of bulk handling and storage, and the relationship with the railway networks then in place, was a concern of Westralian Farmers in the 1930s, as well as that of the Western Australian government of the time.

In 1932, five sidings in the Western Australian Government Railway System were the first locations of bulk handling of wheat by rail:

 Benjaberring
 Korrelocking
 Nembudding
 Trayning
 Yelbeni

From the time of creation of specific railway branches or sections, most railway lines in the era of the WAGR carried mixed services of freight, and passenger services.

1950s 
A number of lines of considerable length were closed in 1957 in the larger railway system.

However, not that many lines closed as a result of the 1957 decisions in the actual wheatbelt region:
 Boddington to Dwarda (1913-1957) and Dwarda to Narrogin (1926-1957)
 Brookton to Corrigin railway (1915-1957)
 Gnowangerup to Ongerup (1913-1957)
 Muckinbudin to Lake Brown (1923-1957) and Lake Brown to Bullfinch (1929-1957)
 Nyabing to Pingrup (1923-1957)

Following the decline of passenger services in the 1950s, many branch lines ceased to have specific passenger services and the WAGR road bus services replaced rail passenger facilities.

1970s 
In the decade of the creation of the brand Westrail, many branch lines had sidings removed, and had ceased to operate as mixed freight lines. They became in many cases oriented to single commodity lines; timber, woodchip, iron ore or grain haulage became the main orientation of many of the branch lines in the narrow gauge network.

Agreements 
In the 1980s a range of agreements between the rail operator and CBH were reached.

Current network

The current wheatbelt railway lines are linked to the extensive network of CBH grain receival points that are serviced by CBH Group as part of the co-operative bulk handling business.

CBH has invested in its own grain haulage rolling stock and locomotives. In 2012 it took delivery of the CBH class locomotives.

Tiers
The Western Australian Minister for Transport, Simon O'Brien, created the Freight and Logistics Council of WA in 2009, composed of individuals involved in transport industries in Western Australia. The Minister commissioned Strategic design + Development Pty Ltd, under the guidance of the Strategic Grain Network Committee (also appointed by the Minister), to conduct a study into the rail network serving the wheatbelt. A report was delivered in December 2009. In the 2009 report, and the state government's response to it, the rail network has been identified as having "tiers" - the Tier 1 and Tier 2 grain haulage railway lines have been deemed to be essential to the operations of the grain freight network. The position taken by the government recommended the closing of the Tier 3 railway lines and developing the "Brookton Strategy", which involves CBH Group investing in rapid grain loading facilities at Brookton and Merredin.

The Tier network is identified on the maps as the railway lines (Tier 2 and 3 as extensions beyond the main Tier 1 network) as following:
Eastern Railway sections
 Kwinana to Avon (Northam) (Tier 2 extends to Miling, and McLevie)
 Northam to Merredin (Tier 3 Merredin to Kondinin)
 Northam to Kalannie (Tier 2 extends to Beacon)
 Northam to Koorda (Tier 2 extends to Mukinbudin)
 Merredin to Southern Cross
Northern Railway sections
 Kwinana to Geraldton (via Moora and Mingenew)
 Geraldton to Mullewa
 Mullewa to Perenjori (Tier 2 extends to Latham)
Southern Railway sections
 Northam to Wagin (Tier 3 to Quairading) (Tier 3 from Narrogin to Merredin) (Tier 3 from Narrogin to Kulin)
 Wagin to Lake Grace
 Lake Grace to Hyden
 Lake Grace to Newdegate
 Wagin to Albany (Tier 3 Katanning to Nyabing) (Tier 3 to Gnowangerup)

Closures

The government decided in 2012 to close the Tier 3 lines and upgrade local and state roads.

Considerable concern was raised as to the closure proposals of the Tier 3 lines, and the expected consequent increase in road traffic.

The Wheatbelt Railway Retention Alliance and the Save Grain on Rail website continued to state the case for retention of the network.

In October 2012, the WA Treasurer Troy Buswell announced a delay in closure of the Tier 3 railway lines, and a move of the onus for upgrading onto the operators, and not for the government to fund or maintain.

The January 2013 report by the Western Australian Auditor General Colin Murphy was critical of the Public Transport Authority and its management of the rail freight network lease.

In early 2013, the Western Australian state election campaign saw increased activity in relation to the issue.

The Wheatbelt Railway Retention Alliance and The West Australian reproduced the map of WA's grain rail network, outlining the context of the three tiers of the rail network.

In September 2013, Buswell repeated his lack of interest in supporting the Tier 3 network, by responding to an issue on the Quairading line.

In October 2013 Brookfield Rail announced closure of two of the Tier 3 railway lines (Merredin-Trayning and York-Quairading), with others not decided upon.

The remaining Tier 3 lines were closed in June 2014.

Arc Infrastructure
In July 2017, Brookfield Rail changed its name to Arc Infrastructure.

Over three years of drawn out mediation and arbitration was carried out between Brookfield/Arc and CBH.

November 2019 
On 1 November 2019, an agreement was finalised between Arc Infrastructure and CBH, after over seven years of actions and negotiations. The agreement involved keeping the Miling railway line open, and all other tier 3 railways closed, and allowing CBH access until 2026.

See also

 Grain storage structures in Western Australia

Notes

References

 
Closed railway lines in Western Australia
Grain transport in Australia
Arc Infrastructure